
Laguna Áquiles is a lake in the Beni Department, Bolivia.

References

Lakes of Beni Department